Beth Levine may refer to:
Beth Levine (fashion designer) (1914–2006), American fashion designer
Beth Levine (physician), medical doctor and researcher